The 1921 Auckland East by-election was a by-election in the New Zealand electorate of Auckland East, an urban seat at the top of the North Island.

The by-election was held on 2 December 1921, and was precipitated by the resignation of sitting Liberal member of parliament and former Mayor of Auckland, Arthur Myers.

Background
The Labour Party selected John A. Lee, the President of the Auckland Labour Representation Committee, as their candidate. Unsuccessful nominees for the Labour candidacy were Rex Mason, James Purtell and Robert Frederick Way.

Result
The following table gives the election results:

Aftermath

References

Auckland East 1921
1921 elections in New Zealand
History of Auckland
Politics of the Auckland Region
1920s in Auckland